The 1977 Lucas Industries British Open Championships was held at Wembley Squash Centre in London from 26 March - 4 April 1977. Geoff Hunt won his fourth title defeating Cameron Nancarrow in the final. The Pakistan government did not allow their leading players to compete because South African players lined up in the field.

Seeds

Draw and results

Final
 Geoff Hunt beat  Cameron Nancarrow 9-4 9-4 8-10 9-4

Section 1

Section 2

References

Men's British Open Squash Championships
Men's British Open Squash Championship
Men's British Open Squash Championship
Men's British Open Squash Championship
Men's British Open Squash Championship
Men's British Open Squash Championship
Squash competitions in London